The Manchester Academy, originally known as the University of Manchester Main Hall, is composed of four concert venues, located on the campus of the University of Manchester, in Manchester, England. The four venues are:  Academy 1, 2 and 3 and Club Academy. Utilised by the Students' Union, the venues are housed in two buildings, the original Students' Union built in 1957 and the academy, built in 1990. In 2004, after the merging of the universities, the venues carried the "Academy" moniker.

History 

Known as Victoria University, the Student Union building was erected in 1957. It began hosting concerts in 1963. The venue hosted many jazz artists in its early dates. The first performance was by Humphrey Lyttelton and His Band, 16 November 1963. The main building housed three of its original venues: the University of Manchester Main Hall (now "Academy 2"), the "Hop and Grape" (later became known as "Solem Bar" and now "Academy 3") and "The Cellar" (also known as "Cellar Disco" and now "Club Academy"). Other music venues on campus were Whitworth Hall and "The Squat". After operating for eight years, the building was demolished and became a carpark. With the music scene expanding in Manchester, there was a need for a larger capacity venue on the campus, in 1984, a proposal was submitted for building a concert venue, adjacent to the original Student Union.

It opened on 18 October 1990 and was first performed in by Buzzcocks. It was closed completely between March and October 2007 when a major refurbishment and rebuilding programme began, completed in early 2008. It had had a capacity of 2000 and hosted about 50 gigs a year prior to closure, the capacity was increased to around 2,300 with the expansion and further increased to 2,600 in September 2013.

Venues 
Academy 1: Opening in 1990 with a capacity of 1,500. At that time, it was considered the third largest concert venue in Manchester. In 2013, the capacity was increased to 2,600. Unlike the other venues, Academy 1 is in a standalone building, south of the original Students' Union. The venue is often just referred to as "Manchester Academy"
Academy 2: Located on the first floor in the original Student Union building, the venue was originally known as the University of Manchester Main Hall. It began to host jazz musicians in 1963. Its capacity is 950.
Academy 3: Known as the "Hop and Grape", the venue is located on the second floor of the original building. Sometime in the 1980s, it was called the "Solem Bar". Of the four venues, it is the smallest, housing 470 guests. 
Club Academy: The third largest venue is located in the basement of the original building. Originally known as "The Cellar" and the "Cellar Disco", the venue grew in popularity after the demolition of The Squat. It can hold up to 650 guests.

Performers
The following list is composed of musicians performing at either the old or new buildings, from 1963–present.

AC/DC
Adele
Aimee Mann 
As It Is
Banks (singer) 
Beartooth
Blur
Big Time Rush
Captain Beefheart
The Chainsmokers
Cheap Trick
Cream
The Cure
The Damned
Daughtry
David Bowie 
Death Angel 
Dire Straits
dodie
Don Broco
Editors (band)
Ellie Goulding
Enter Shikari 
Exodus 
Fairport Convention
Fall Out Boy
Garbage
George Clinton
Goldfrapp
Hawkwind
Hayley Kiyoko
Hole
Bruno Mars
Hurts
IDLES
Ian Brown
The Jimi Hendrix Experience
J Hus
Joe Cocker
JoJo
Kings of Leon
KSI
Kylie Minogue
Lady Gaga
Tove lo 
The La’s
The Levellers
The Libertines
Lukas Graham
Mabel
Manic Street Preachers
Marillion
Mastodon
Megadeth
The Mission
Mist
The Moody Blues
Morcheeba
Muse
Melanie C
Nazareth
New Found Glory
Nirvana
Northlane
Oasis
Oliver Tree
Paramore
Pink Floyd
Poppy
Prince
Procol Harum
Prodigy
Queen
Sia
Slade
Status Quo
Steel Panther 
The Stranglers
Stevie Wonder
Sum 41
Super Furry Animals
Supergrass
Testament
Union J
The Velvet Underground
The Verve
Waterparks
The Wailers
Watsky
The Who
The Wildhearts
The Yardbirds
Yung Lean
The Zangwills

Reception
Following the re-opening of Academy 1 in October 2007, University of Manchester Students' Union came under much criticism for large parts of the refurbishment being incomplete. Customers originally had to use portable toilet facilities outside, suffered long queues for the one small bar and had no access to a cloakroom. These problems were eventually rectified with the opening of the completely rebuilt foyer, which included a sizeable bar and VIP balcony and lounge (also open to customers with disabilities).

Awards
Manchester Academy has attracted positive publicity after being referred to as the UK's "greenest venue" with a third of the £3.5 million refurbishment budget going towards minimising the environmental impact and improving the sustainability of the reconstructed venue, as well as making substantial accommodation for disabled music fans. It also received the title of "Best Entertainment Venue" in the 2007 MCR Awards.

References

External links

 Official website

Music venues in Manchester
University of Manchester